Exomvourgo is a former municipality on the island of Tinos, in the Cyclades, Greece. Since the 2011 local government reform it is part of the municipality Tinos, of which it is a municipal unit. The population was 2,403 at the 2011 census. Its land area is 138.213 km². The seat of the municipality was in Xinara. The municipal unit shares the island of Tinos with the municipal units of Tinos (town) and Panormos.

External links
Official website  
Meteorological station Tinos, Mount Exombourgo, elevation 595 m.

References

Tinos